The siege of Groenlo was a siege of Groenlo during the Eighty Years' War and the Anglo–Spanish War by a Dutch and English army led by Maurice of Nassau after it had followed an unsuccessful siege by Maurice in 1595.

History 
The siege lasted from 11 to 28 September 1597 and ended in the town's capture from its Spanish garrison.

After the capture the troops moved to take Bredevoort and formed part of Maurice's successful offensives against the Spanish in 1597.

Groenlo was then held by the States until a siege in 1606 by Ambrosio Spinola.

References 
Citations

Bibliography
 
 

Groenlo
1597 in the Dutch Republic
1597 in the Habsburg Netherlands
16th-century military history of the Kingdom of England
16th-century military history of Spain
Eighty Years' War (1566–1609)
Groenlo (1597)
Groenlo (1597)
Groenlo (1597)
Groenlo (1597)
Groenlo
History of Oost Gelre